Umar Kiyani (born 5 August 1995) is a Pakistani cricketer. He made his first-class debut for Islamabad in the 2014–15 Quaid-e-Azam Trophy on 30 October 2014.

References

External links
 

1995 births
Living people
Pakistani cricketers
Islamabad cricketers
Cricketers from Islamabad